Lattaville is an unincorporated community in Ross County, in the U.S. state of Ohio.

History
Variant names were "Lattas" and "Lattasville". A post office called Lattas was established in 1833, and remained in operation until 1903. The community has the name of a pioneer citizen.

References

Unincorporated communities in Ross County, Ohio
Unincorporated communities in Ohio
1833 establishments in Ohio